Saule is the French equivalent for the Willow

Saule may refer to:

Places
Saule, settlement in Beverīna municipality, Latvia
Saule, settlement in Jaunpils municipality, Latvia
Saule, settlement in Limbaži municipality, Latvia
Saule, settlement in Valka municipality, Latvia
Saule Station, train station on Riga – Lugaži Railway, Latvia

Persons
Saulė, solar goddess in Baltic mythology
Rudolfs Saulē, Latvian-American actor, ballerina and performer of the Twentieth Century
Saule (given name), a Kazakh, Afghan, Kyrgyz female given name
Saule (singer), Belgian singer-songwriter

Others
Battle of Saule, between the Livonian Brothers of the Sword and Samogitians in 1236, according to the official Lithuanian view, near modern Šiauliai, the city nicknamed Saulės miestas (Sun City)

See also
Saules (disambiguation)